Ulytau Region is a region of Kazakhstan. The administrative center of the region is the city of Jezkazgan. Kazakh President Kassym-Jomart Tokayev announced on 16 March 2022 that the region would be created. The area split off from Karaganda Region when Tokayev's bill came into force on 8 June 2022. On 11 June 2022 Berik Bakhytovich Abdygaliev was appointed akim of the Ulytau region. The region's borders roughly correspond to the western half of the old Jezkazgan Region which was liquidated in 1997 and merged with Karaganda Region.

References

External links